Bratschen are weathering products that occur as a result of frost and aeolian corrasion almost exclusively on the calc-schists of the Upper Slate Mantle (Obere Schieferhülle) in the High Tauern mountains of Austria. The term is German but is used untranslated in English sources.

The calc-schist, which appears blue-gray when freshly broken, weathers to a yellow to brown colour and flakes off on the surface to form bratschen.

These form steep (up to 40°), rocky, almost unvegetated mountainsides with an odd and rough-textured surface, caused by wind erosion. Bratschen are found on the mountains such as the Fuscherkarkopf, the Großer Bärenkopf, the Kitzsteinhorn, the Schwerteck, or on the eponymous Bratschenköpfen.

References

Sources
 

Geomorphology
Hohe Tauern
Geology of the Alps